Centre Township was a township that existed in Camden County, New Jersey from 1855 through 1926.

Centre Township was incorporated as a township by an Act of the New Jersey Legislature on March 6, 1855, from portions of the now-defunct Union Township: 

Over the years, portions of Centre Township were taken to create several new municipalities:
Haddon Heights on March 2, 1904 (also portions of Haddon Township)
Magnolia on April 14, 1915 (also portions of Clementon)
Barrington on March 27, 1917
Tavistock on February 16, 1921
Brooklawn on March 11, 1924
Bellmawr on March 23, 1926
Mount Ephraim on March 23, 1926
Runnemede on March 23, 1926
Lawnside on March 24, 1926 (also portions of Barrington)

With the creation of Lawnside, Centre Township was officially dissolved.

See also
 List of historical Camden County, New Jersey municipalities

References

External links
 The Township of Centre

 

1855 establishments in New Jersey
1926 disestablishments in New Jersey
Former municipalities in Camden County, New Jersey
Former townships in New Jersey
Populated places established in 1855